Idhayam may refer to:

Idhayam (film), a 1991 Tamil film
Idhayam (brand), a brand of sesame oil
Idhayam Foundation(NGO), a Charity organization in Tamil Nadu, India